Chuei Magon is a boma in Anyidi payam, Bor East County, Jonglei State, South Sudan, about 25 kilometers east of Bor.

Demographics
According to the Fifth Population and Housing Census of Sudan, conducted in April 2008, Chuei Magon boma had a population of 8,640 people, composed of 4,659 male and 3,981 female residents.

Notes

References 

Populated places in Jonglei State